Gary Leon Cutsinger (born February 4, 1940) is a former professional American football player who played defensive end for six seasons for the Houston Oilers.

References

1940 births
Living people
People from Perry, Oklahoma
Players of American football from Oklahoma
American football defensive ends
Oklahoma State Cowboys football players
Houston Oilers players
American Football League players